Michael De Wayne Paxton (born September 3, 1953) is a former Major League Baseball starting pitcher. He batted and threw right-handed.

Paxton was originally drafted out of Oakhaven High School in Memphis by the New York Yankees in the 1971 Major League Baseball draft, but did not sign, choosing instead to attend Memphis State. After four seasons with the Memphis Tigers, in which he was a four-year letter winner under head coach Bobby Kilpatrick, Paxton was drafted by the Boston Red Sox in the 1975 Major League Baseball draft.

He debuted with the Red Sox on May 25, starting the second game of a doubleheader with the Minnesota Twins, as he pitched 2.1 innings to take the loss. For the season, Paxton went 10-5 with a 3.83 earned run average and 58 strikeouts splitting his time as a starter, and out of the bullpen.

Following his only season with the BoSox, Paxton was dealt to the Cleveland Indians with Ted Cox, Bo Díaz and Rick Wise for Dennis Eckersley and Fred Kendall. On April 8, 1978, Paxton recorded the only save of his MLB career. Surprisingly, it came on opening day of the 1978 season. The Indians defeated the Royals 8-5 and Paxton pitched the final three innings of the game, preserving the win for starting pitcher Wayne Garland. On July 21, 1978, Paxton struck out four batters in the fifth inning of an 11–0 win over the Seattle Mariners.

See also
 List of Major League Baseball single-inning strikeout leaders

References

External links
, or Baseball Almanac

Boston Red Sox players
Cleveland Indians players
Major League Baseball pitchers
1953 births
Living people
Baseball players from Memphis, Tennessee
Memphis Tigers baseball players
Charleston Charlies players
Tacoma Tigers players
Pawtucket Red Sox players
Rhode Island Red Sox players
Winston-Salem Red Sox players
Elmira Pioneers players
Bristol Red Sox players